Baruchyan is a surname. Notable people with the surname include:

Aviram Baruchyan (born 1985), Israeli footballer
Evyatar Baruchyan (born 1989), Israeli footballer

Hebrew-language surnames